Renald Castillon (born in France is a French motorcycle racer. Castillon has also been a competitor in the European Junior Cup in 2013.

Career statistics

Grand Prix motorcycle racing

By season

Races by year

References

External links
 

Living people
French motorcycle racers
Moto3 World Championship riders
Year of birth missing (living people)